Hans Christian Tikkanen (born 6 February 1985 in Karlstad) is a Swedish chess grandmaster. He is a five-time Swedish Chess Champion.

Chess career
He won the Swedish Junior Chess Championship in 2002. In 2010 he won the Lithuanian University of Agriculture Cup in Kaunas and tied for 3rd–6th with Sarunas Sulskis, Tiger Hillarp Persson and Kaido Kulaots at Borup. In 2012, he came second in the Group C of the Tata Steel Chess Tournament in Wijk aan Zee, and shared first place with Slavko Cicak and Emanuel Berg at the Västerås Open. He played for Sweden in the European Team Chess Championships of 2005 (in team 3), 2011 and 2013

In the January 2012 FIDE list, he had an Elo rating of 2549, making him Sweden's seventh highest ranked player.

Tikkanen is co-author with Axel Smith of the chess training book The Woodpecker Method (Quality Chess, 2018).

Football career
Tikkanen played besides his chess career, active football in the Swedish Division 5 Sydvästra B club Hallands Nations FF.

Personal life
Tikkanen is of Finnish descent through his Finnish-born father.

References

External links

1985 births
Living people
Chess grandmasters
Swedish chess players
People from Karlstad
Swedish people of Finnish descent